Yoan Tanga (born 29 November 1996) is a French rugby union player, who plays for La Rochelle.

He was first selected for the French national rugby team in January 2022, for the following Six Nations tournament.

References

External link

1996 births
Sportspeople from Bondy
Living people
French rugby union players
Rugby union flankers
Rugby union number eights
SU Agen Lot-et-Garonne players
Racing 92 players